The Fergana Challenger is a professional outdoor tennis tournament that is held annually in Fergana Uzbekistan. This tournament is part of the ATP Challenger Tour and the ITF Women's Circuit. The Men's singles event of the 2013 Fergana Challenger cumulated with Radu Albot winning the title, defeating Ilija Bozoljac in the final, 7–6(11–9), 6–7(3–7), 6–1. Yuki Bhambri was the defending champion but decided not to participate.

Seeds

Draw

Finals

Top half

Bottom half

References
 Main Draw
 Qualifying Draw

Fergana Challenger - Men's Singles
2013 Men's Singles